Spatalistis armata is a species of moth of the family Tortricidae. It is found in India (Assam).

References

Moths described in 1966
armata
Moths of Asia
Taxa named by Józef Razowski